The 2007 Hart Council election took place on 3 May 2007 to elect members of Hart District Council in Hampshire, England. One third of the council was up for election and the council stayed under no overall control.

After the election, the composition of the council was:
Conservative 15
Liberal Democrat 12
Community Campaign (Hart) 6
Independent 2

Election result
The results saw the council remain without any party having a majority. The Conservatives remained the largest party with 15 seats despite losing 1 seat to the Community Campaign (Hart) (CCH). Christopher Axam gained Fleet Courtmoor for the CCH after winning 828 votes, compared to 758 for the Conservatives. This meant the CCH had 6 seats on the council, while the Liberal Democrats held the seats they had been defending to remain with 12 councillors. Overall turnout in the election was 35.85%.

Following the election a Conservative bid to take control of the council failed with the existing Liberal Democrat, Community Campaign (Hart) and Independent coalition continuing after a 20-15 vote.

Ward results

Blackwater and Hawley

Church Crookham West

Eversley

Fleet Courtmoor

Fleet North

Frogmore and Darby Green

Hartley Wintney

Hook

Odiham

Yateley East

Yateley North

References

2007
2007 English local elections
2000s in Hampshire